A Man without a Shadow is a 2019 Melodrama Iranian film written, produced and directed by Alireza Raeesian. It stars Leila Hatami, Ali Mosaffa, Farhad Aslani, Amir Aghaei, Gohar Kheirandish, Nader Fallah, Siamak Atlasi, and Nasim Adabi. it shot in Iran and Spain and premiered at the 37th Fajr Film Festival. The film depicts some emotional and matrimonial challenges of Iranian modern society. The film attended a number of international film fests including, the 10th edition of the London Iranian Film Festival in the United Kingdom and the 18th Dhaka International Film Festival in Bangladesh. The Malaysia International Film Festival listed this film in its "Official selection" in 2020, alongside the Asian Film Festival Barcelona listed it in its "Special section" in the same year.

Summary 
Mahan is a documentary filmmaker. When he makes a documentary about an honor killing, his film is rejected by the broadcaster and he consequently gets fired. He feels his personal life is in danger, especially when he is threatened by the victim's family. To help Mahan, his wife Sayeh finds a good job in a big company. Sayeh goes to Spain with her boss to sign a big deal, but she disappears upon her return.

References

External links 
 

2019 films
2019 drama films
Iranian drama films
2019 multilingual films
2010s Persian-language films
2010s Spanish-language films
Iranian multilingual films
Spanish multilingual films
Films shot in Spain
Films shot in Iran
Spanish drama films